The Hong Kong Auxiliary Police Force provides additional manpower to the Hong Kong Police Force, especially during emergencies and other incidents. 

The HKAPF's mandate is governed by the Hong Kong Auxiliary Police Force Ordinance.

History
The Hong Kong Auxiliary Police Force was officially established in 1957 with the merger of the 'Special' and 'Reserve' formations which had been in intermittent existence since the 1880s.

The part-timers were formally established in 1914 as the Police Reserve unit, when numerous full-time officers returned to Europe to fight in the World War I. From 1969 to 1997, the Hong Kong Auxiliary Force was known as the Royal Hong Kong Auxiliary Police Force.

Today the Hong Kong Auxiliary Police Force forms an about 4,500 reserves of manpower to assist in times of natural disaster or civil emergency. Officers are involved in reinforcing daily duties and performing crowd control at public events and festivals. The ability to assist during times of emergency is retained. The Commandant reports to the Commissioner of Police.

Rank
The rank structure of the HKAPF:

 Commandant, HKAPF 
 Deputy Commandant, HKAPF 
 Chief Superintendent (Auxiliary) 
 Senior Superintendent (Auxiliary) 
 Superintendent (Auxiliary) 
 Chief Inspector (Auxiliary) 
 Senior Inspector (Auxiliary) 
 Inspector (Auxiliary) 
 Station Sergeant (Auxiliary) 
 Sergeant (Auxiliary) 
 Senior Constable / Constable (Auxiliary)
 Recruit Constable (Auxiliary)

Command Organization

 Operations (Auxiliary)
 Human Resources (Auxiliary)
 Training (Auxiliary)
 Administration and Support (Auxiliary)

List of Commandants

 Edgar YANG Joe-tsi 2016-
 James Yeung-Lung Yiu 2010–2016
 Arthur Kwok Chi-shun 2001-2010

Regional Organization

 Hong Kong Island (Auxiliary)
 Kowloon West (Auxiliary)
 Kowloon East (Auxiliary)
 New Territories North (Auxiliary)
 New Territories South (Auxiliary)

Weapons
The members of the Hong Kong Auxiliary Police Force are trained in the use of, and issued, the same equipment and weapons same as its regular counterpart.

Officers are issued the Smith & Wesson Model 10 revolvers as sidearms with 12 rounds of ammunition along with an ASP expendable baton and a Sabre Red pepper spray for less-than-lethal options when patrolling on the street.

Small quantity of members are trained for missions that involve the guard of consulates and police stations, which they are armed with an addition of the Remington 870 shotgun in 12 Gauge.

Uniform
Hong Kong Auxiliary Police Force uniform are the same as those worn by the HKP:

 Uniform Branch: Dark navy blue jacket with the words Police in English and Chinese in reflective white on the front left breast and back. Light blue shirts and white are worn by officers depending on ranks, dark navy blue cargo pants and black caps for all officers. Most HKAP members are armed like members of the regular HKP.

Ranks from constables to sergeant consists of numbers begin with the letter A. Senior officers have "HKAP" at the bottom of their shoulder mark.

References

External links 
 Hong Kong Auxiliary Police Force Website
 Hong Kong Auxiliary Police Club

Hong Kong Police Force
Auxiliary police units